Grand Prix motorcycle racing is the premier championship of motorcycle road racing, which has been divided into three classes: MotoGP, Moto2, and Moto3. Classes that have been discontinued include 500cc (although 500cc statistics are combined with MotoGP officially), 350cc, 250cc, 125cc, 80cc, 50cc and Sidecar.  The Grand Prix Road-Racing World Championship was established in 1949 by the sport's governing body, the Fédération Internationale de Motocyclisme (FIM), and is the oldest motorsport World Championship.

This list only lists pole positions since , when pole positions were first officially recorded. Marc Márquez holds the record for the most pole positions in the premier class with 63. Mick Doohan is second with 58 poles, and Valentino Rossi is third with 55 poles.

By rider

By nationality

References

polesitters